Meaggan Wilton (born 29 February 1976) is a Canadian softball player. She competed in the women's tournament at the 2000 Summer Olympics.

References

External links
 

1976 births
Living people
Canadian softball players
Olympic softball players of Canada
Softball players at the 2000 Summer Olympics
People from Penetanguishene
Sportspeople from Simcoe County